Abmah (also Romanized as Ābmāh; also known as Āb Mār) is a village in Gohreh Rural District, Fin District, Bandar Abbas County, Hormozgan Province, Iran. At the 2006 census, its population was 149, in 31 families.

References 

Populated places in Bandar Abbas County